Tyrannochthonius rex is a species of pseudoscorpion in the family Chthoniidae.

References

Further reading

 

Chthoniidae
Articles created by Qbugbot
Animals described in 1989